Howell Park may refer to:

Eliza Howell Park, a park in Detroit
John Howell Memorial Park, a park in Atlanta
Howell Park Golf Course, a golf course in New Jersey